Jaume Sureda Morey (born 25 July 1996) is a Spanish former professional cyclist, who rode professionally between 2019 and 2021 for the  team.

Major results
2020
 5th Overall Tour de Taiwan

References

External links

1996 births
Living people
Spanish male cyclists
People from Son Servera
Sportspeople from Mallorca
Cyclists from the Balearic Islands